Odontota is a genus of tortoise beetles and hispines in the family Chrysomelidae. There are about nine described species in Odontota.

Species
These nine species belong to the genus Odontota:
 Odontota arizonica (Uhmann, 1938)
 Odontota barberi Butte
 Odontota dorsalis (Thunberg, 1805) (locust leaf miner)
 Odontota floridana Butte, 1968
 Odontota horni J. Smith, 1885 (soybean leafminer)
 Odontota mundula (Sanderson, 1951)
 Odontota notata (Olivier, 1808)
 Odontota scapularis (Olivier, 1808) (orange-shouldered leaf miner)
 Odontota signaticollis

References

Further reading

External links

 

Cassidinae
Articles created by Qbugbot